Vicente Domingo Di Paola Cammarota, known as Vicente Di Paola (born 12 August 1923, date of death unknown) was an Argentine professional football player.

Di Paola played 3 seasons (78 games, 5 goals) in the Serie A for A.S. Roma and three seasons in the Portuguese Primeira Divisão with Lusitano de Évora (70 games, 8 goals). Di Paola is deceased.

References

1923 births
Year of death missing
Argentine people of Italian descent
Argentine footballers
Argentine expatriate footballers
Expatriate footballers in Italy
Serie A players
A.S. Roma players
Serie B players
Pisa S.C. players
Expatriate footballers in Spain
La Liga players
UE Lleida players
Argentine expatriate sportspeople in Italy
Argentine expatriate sportspeople in Spain
Association football midfielders
Footballers from Buenos Aires